Unconvention: A Mix-Tape from St. Paul, RNC '08 is a documentary directed by Minneapolis artist Chris Strouth about the 2008 Republican National Convention in St. Paul, Minnesota. The film edits together a wide variety of film and video shot by dozens of independent journalists and citizen videographers with divergent political viewpoints, compiling a mosaic of perspectives on the four days of the convention. It was produced by Alternavision Films, a California production company specializing in political documentaries. Unconvention was one of eight full-length features chosen to debut as part of the "Minnesota Made" series at the 2009 Minneapolis–Saint Paul International Film Festival.

Critical reception
While the film was not widely distributed, it received accolades from several critics. The Minnesota Daily'''s Tony Libera called it "an engaging, at times terrifying, record" of the events surrounding the RNC. Peter S. Scholtes of City Pages said, "Whenever it opens, you must see Unconvention''," adding that "the movie feels raw, unprocessed, and complex—with an eye toward every possible irony."

References

External links

Official movie site

2009 films
2009 documentary films
American documentary films
American independent films
Documentary films about elections in the United States
2008 United States presidential election in popular culture
2008 Republican National Convention
Documentary films about Minnesota
2009 directorial debut films
Films shot in Minnesota
2000s English-language films
2000s American films